is a side scrolling platform game released by Irem to arcades in 1989. The player controls a caped hero named Tommy in his quest to rescue a princess. Tommy can cast fireballs (which can be upgraded in power) to dispatch enemies, and jump on their heads to temporarily stun them.

The game was ported to the TurboGrafx-16 in 1991 and localized to North America in 1993. The TurboGrafx-16 version was re-released on the Wii Virtual Console in Japan on September 4, 2007, in North America on September 24, 2007 (delisted on March 30, 2012; returning in September 2013), and in PAL regions on September 28, 2007. The game was then released for the Wii U Virtual Console in Japan on March 18, 2015, in North America on October 12, 2017, and in PAL regions on October 12, 2017.

Reception 
In Japan, Game Machine listed Legend of Hero Tonma on their June 1, 1989 issue as being the tenth most-popular arcade game for the previous two weeks.

References

External links

1989 video games
Arcade video games
Platform games
TurboGrafx-16 games
Video games developed in Japan
Virtual Console games
Virtual Console games for Wii U
Irem games